Americina is a genus of dung flies in the family Scathophagidae. There is at least one described species in Americina, A. adusta.

References

Further reading

 

Scathophagidae
Articles created by Qbugbot
Schizophora genera